Seven Seasons of Buffy is a 2003 academic publication relating to the fictional Buffyverse established by the television series Buffy the Vampire Slayer and Angel.

Book description and contents

A batch of essays from science-fiction and fantasy writers that examine the show's scope, the growth of its characters, and the effect it had on its fans.

External links
Phil-books.com - review of this book
Nika-summers.com - review of "Seven Seasons of Buffy"
Ink 19.com - review of this book

Books about the Buffyverse
2003 non-fiction books
BenBella Books books